Chloroclystis coloptila is a moth in the family Geometridae. It is found on the Marquesas Archipelago.

Description

References

External links

Moths described in 1929
coloptila
Moths of Oceania